Tyurya, sometimes known as murtsovka, is a traditional bread soup in the Russian cuisine, sometimes considered a variant of okroshka. It consists of chunks of bread, often stale or semi-stale, or dried/baked  into sukhari biscuits/hardtack, soaked in a flavorful liquid or, alternatively, plain water, with some vegetables (chiefly onion, garlic or sauerkraut) and vegetable oil added and flavored with salt and pepper. The base liquid could be anything that can be consumed cold, because unlike most other bread soups, tyurya was prepared and consumed without heat. Kvass was historically the most popular base for tyurya, due to it being cheap, plentiful and flavorful enough. A dairy base, like plain or sour milk, whey or kefir was considered fancy and was generally prepared for children, the elderly or the infirm. It is, along with pokhlyobka, a traditional Lenten soup.

Made with black bread, it was a staple food of the Russian Red Army during World War II.

Synonyms and etymology 
The dish has many synonyms, both general Russian and local: tyura, turka, tubka, tyupka, murtsovka, mura, ruli, kawardachok.

In case the bread is added in the form of rusks (rus.suhari), it is often called a «suharnitsa».

In the Tula province, a tyurya made of bread, onions, kvass and vegetable oil was called uvanchiki.

The Russian name "tyurya" occurred from Türkic * tӱ̄r (from tyur, tyir) "crumb": "a meal of crushed bread with water". From the Russian language, the word "tyurya" has penetrated into the Latvian ( – food from water, bread and onions) and Belarusian (along with other synonyms — мурцоўка, рулі, мочёнки, мочёунки).

"Murtsovka" comes from the French morceaux: "pieces".

"Mura" - from the Finnish muru: "crumb".

History and preparation
In the most popular and probably original variant, tyurya was the cheap, cooling and filling meal for a peasant in the field. Several slices of day-old rye bread, diced onion and some fresh herbs were combined in a bowl and soaked with a liberal amount of kvass, then flavored with salt and optionally pepper. Some vegetable oil was often added, historically linseed, mustard or cheaper olive oil, as sunflowers only become popular in Russia in the late nineteenth century. When a family could spare some dairy, or when someone was ill, the festive, dessert tyurya, considered more palatable and easily digestible, was prepared, which was sweetened with honey or, later, white sugar.

References

General references
 Tyuryas: William Pokhlyobkin, "Cuisines of our peoples", in Russian

Cold soups
Russian soups
Bread soups
Rye-based dishes
Lenten foods
Staple foods
Military food
Cultural history of World War II
Soviet Union in World War II